The Jones Mill Site, designated by the Smithsonian trinomial 3HS28, is a prehistoric archaeological site near Jones Mill in Hot Spring County, Arkansas.  It is a deeply stratified site, with evidence of human habitation in at least three different time periods.  It is one of the few documented Archaic sites in the region, with evidence of human activity dating to 3000 BCE.  It is located near documented prehistoric stone quarry sites, and finds at the site include extensive stone tool construction artifacts.

The site was listed on the National Register of Historic Places in 1988.

See also
 Lake Catherine Quarry: a nearby Native American chert quarry
 National Register of Historic Places listings in Hot Spring County, Arkansas

References

Archaeological sites on the National Register of Historic Places in Arkansas
National Register of Historic Places in Hot Spring County, Arkansas
Archaic period in North America
Mining in Arkansas
Native American history of Arkansas
Lake Catherine State Park
Lithics